Zapotillo may refer to:

Zapotillo, Ecuador, town in Ecuador, capital of the Zapotillo Canton
Zapotillo Canton, canton in Loja Province, Ecuador
Zapotillo, Panama, corregimiento in Las Palmas District, Veraguas Province, Panama
Zapotillo River, river in Mexico